Diary of a Passion (Italian: Brogliaccio d'amore) is a 1976 Italian drama film directed by Deco Silla and starring Enrico Maria Salerno, Senta Berger and Paolo Carlini.

Cast
 Enrico Maria Salerno as Giacomo 
 Senta Berger  as Roberta 
 Paolo Carlini  as Pierino 
 Marisa Valenti  as Patrizia 
 Annibale Papetti  as Industriale
 Antiniska Nemour  as spogliarellista
 Lorenzo Fineschi 
 Anna Maria Sprega 
 Tino Polenghi 
 Rosanna Callegari 
 Aurelio Drago 
 Anny Ricciarelli 
 Silvana Quagliotti 
 Maria Fausta Tornaghi 
 Silvia Mango 
 Loredana Lovatti 
 Barbara Postir 
 Roberto Vasconi 
 Umberto Racepre

References

Bibliography 
 Goble, Alan. The Complete Index to Literary Sources in Film. Walter de Gruyter, 1999.

External links 
 

1976 films
Italian drama films
1976 drama films
1970s Italian-language films
1970s Italian films